Tetragonoderus aegypticus is a species of beetle in the family Carabidae. It was described by Jedlicka in 1952.

References

aegypticus
Beetles described in 1952